Causal AI is an artificial intelligence system that can explain cause and effect. Causal AI technology is used by organisations to help explain decision making and the causes for a decision.

Systems based on causal AI, by identifying the underlying web of causality for a behaviour or event, provide insights that solely predictive AI models might fail to extract from historical data. An analysis of causality may be used to supplement human decisions in situations where understanding the causes behind an outcome is necessary, such as quantifying the impact of different interventions, policy decisions or performing scenario planning.

The concept of causal AI and the limits of machine learning were raised by Judea Pearl, the Turing Award-winning computer scientist and philosopher, in The Book of Why: The New Science of Cause and Effect. Pearl asserted: “Machines' lack of understanding of causal relations is perhaps the biggest roadblock to giving them human-level intelligence.”

Columbia University has established a Causal AI Lab under Director Elias Bareinboim. Professor Bareinboim’s research focuses on causal and counterfactual inference and their applications to data-driven fields in the health and social sciences as well as artificial intelligence and machine learning.
Senslytics has applied Intuition AI, a hypotheses iteration based causation learning framework to interpret rare events in oil and gas upstream operation. 
Technological research and consulting firm Gartner for the first time included causal AI in its 2022 Hype Cycle report, citing it as one of five critical technologies in accelerated AI automation. Developers of causal AI software include causaLens, Xplain Data,  Geminos, CML Insight, Qualcomm and NEUSREL

References 

Applications of artificial intelligence
Causal inference